Michael Parsons (born October 3, 1995) is an American ice dancer. With his skating partner, Caroline Green, he is the 2022 Four Continents champion, a four-time medalist on the ISU Challenger Series, and a three-time U.S. national medalist.

With his sister and former skating partner Rachel Parsons, he is the 2018 NHK Trophy bronze medalist and a four-time silver medalist on the ISU Challenger Series (2018 CS Asian Open, 2018 CS Nebelhorn Trophy, 2018 CS Lombardia Trophy, 2017 CS Ondrej Nepela Memorial). Earlier in their career together, the Parsons won gold at the 2017 World Junior Championships, the 2016 Junior Grand Prix Final, and in the junior event at the 2017 U.S. Championships.

Personal life
Michael Parsons was born October 3, 1995 in Wheaton, Maryland. He has two sisters, Rachel and Katie. He is majoring in biology at Montgomery College in Rockville, Maryland.

Career

Early years 
Parsons started learning to skate at age seven to play hockey but ultimately chose figure skating. He joined the Wheaton Ice Skating Academy in December 2003. Early in his ice dancing career, he skated with Kristina Rexford.

He teamed up with his sister, Rachel, in February 2010. They won gold on the novice level at the 2011 U.S. Championships and debuted on the Junior Grand Prix (JGP) series in September 2011, placing 9th in Gdańsk, Poland. After taking the junior pewter medal at the 2012 U.S. Championships, they represented the United States at the 2012 Winter Youth Olympics, placing 4th. They were also selected for the 2012 World Junior Championships in Minsk, Belarus, where they finished 15th.

Competing in the 2012–13 JGP series, the Parsons placed sixth in Linz, Austria, before taking bronze in Zagreb, Croatia.

2013–2014 season 
The Parsons obtained silver at both of their 2013–14 JGP assignments, which took place in Košice, Slovakia, and Ostrava, Czech Republic. They qualified for the JGP Final in Fukuoka, Japan, where they placed sixth. The duo won bronze at the junior level at the 2014 U.S. Championships and capped off their season with an 8th-place finish at the 2014 World Junior Championships in Sofia, Bulgaria.

2014–2015 season 
The Parsons medaled at both their 2014–15 JGP assignments, receiving bronze in Aichi, Japan, and silver in Zagreb, Croatia. They finished as the first alternates for the JGP Final and won silver on the junior level at the 2015 U.S. Championships. Concluding their season, they placed fourth at the 2015 World Junior Championships in Tallinn, Estonia.

2015–16 season: Junior World silver 
During the 2015–16 JGP series, the Parsons were awarded gold in Bratislava, Slovakia, and Zagreb, Croatia. Competing in Barcelona, Spain, at their second JGP Final, the siblings took the bronze medal behind McNamara/Carpenter and Loboda/Drozd, having placed second in the short dance and fifth in the free. At the 2016 World Junior Championships in Debrecen, Hungary, they placed first in the short and second in the free, winning the silver medal behind McNamara/Carpenter.

2016–17 season: Junior World gold 
Competing in their sixth JGP season, the Parsons were awarded gold in Yokohama, Japan, and Dresden, Germany, both times ahead of Russia's Shpilevaya/Smirnov. In December 2016, they competed at the JGP Final in Marseille, France; ranked second in the short and first in the free, they won the title by a margin of 0.63 over Loboda/Drozd.

The following month, the Parsons would win their first junior national title at the 2017 U.S. Championships, over 11 points clear of the field. The siblings would cap off their undefeated season by winning the 2017 World Junior Championships; similar to the 2016–17 JGP Final, the Parsons won the event overall after placing second in the short and first in the free, earning an even narrower victory of 0.56 ahead of Loboda/Drozd. The Parsons earned personal bests in their combined total and free dance scores on their fifth Junior Championships trip.

2017–18 season: International senior debut 
Moving to the senior level, the Parsons debuted at the Lake Placid Ice Dance International, winning the silver medal behind longtime rivals McNamara/Carpenter, who were also making their senior debut.  They then took the silver medal at the 2017 CS Ondrej Nepela Trophy, their debut on the ISU Challenger series. Assigned to two Grand Prix events, they finished ninth at Skate America and seventh at the Rostelecom Cup.  They then competed at a second Challenger event, the Golden Spin of Zagreb, where they finished eighth.

Competing at the senior level at the 2018 U.S. Championships, they placed fifth and thus did not qualify for the U.S. Olympic team.  They were instead sent to the 2018 Four Continents Championships, where they finished sixth.

2018–19 season: End of Parsons/Parsons 

After a second straight silver medal at Lake Placid's summer ice dance event, the siblings competed in three straight Challenger events, winning consecutive silver medals at the Asian Open, Nebelhorn Trophy and Nepela Trophy.  At their first Grand Prix event in Japan, the 2018 NHK Trophy, they won their first and only Grand Prix medal, a bronze. They finished fifth at the 2018 Internationaux de France, their second Grand Prix. The Parsons placed sixth at the 2019 U.S. Championships.

On April 2, 2019, Rachel announced on Instagram that she was retiring from figure skating following a lengthy struggle with an eating disorder.  Michael said he intended to continue skating with a new partner.

2019–20 season: Debut of Green/Parsons 
On June 20, 2019, it was announced that Parsons had formed a partnership with Caroline Green, the 2019 U.S junior champion.  Green was several years younger than Parsons, an age difference that he said, "on the ice, I really don’t think it matters that much."  Green/Parsons placed fifth at Lake Placid Ice Dance International and the 2019 CS Lombardia Trophy.  Making their senior Grand Prix debut as a team, they placed seventh at 2019 Skate America.  Parsons remarked that "I’m very pleasantly surprised at how well she has adapted to senior.  She has done really well, and I couldn’t be happier."  Competing the following week at the 2019 Skate Canada International, Green/Parsons again placed seventh. They won their first international medal, a bronze, at the 2019 CS Warsaw Cup behind Lauriault/Le Gac of France and Russia's Konkina/Drozd.

Competing at their first U.S. Championships, Green/Parsons placed fifth in the rhythm dance. They were fifth in the free dance, despite a fall.  Parsons said afterward that they were "still a very young team, but it's coming along faster than I ever expected. I couldn't be more proud; I am very happy."

2020–21 season 
The coronavirus pandemic and resultant lockdowns resulted in Green and Parsons not being able to see or train with each other from March to June. Caroline enlisted her brother Gordon as a training partner at home.  In order to limit international travel, the ISU assigned the Grand Prix based on geographic location, and Green/Parsons attended the 2020 Skate America.  They finished in fourth place.

Green/Parsons went on to finish fourth at the 2021 U.S. Championships, taking the pewter medal.

2021–22 season: Four Continents gold 
For their free dance, Green, Parsons, and their choreographers opted to design a program in emulation of Martha Graham's style of modern dance, which Parsons characterized as involving "a lot of emotion into almost sparse movements."

Green/Parsons made their Olympic season debut at the 2021 CS Autumn Classic International, winning the bronze medal. Competing next on the Grand Prix at the 2021 Skate Canada International, they finished in fourth place. They were initially assigned to the 2021 Cup of China as their second Grand Prix, but following its cancellation, they were reassigned to the 2021 Gran Premio d'Italia. They placed fourth in the rhythm dance but dropped to fifth place after Green fell exiting a lift in the free dance.

Entering the 2022 U.S. Championships seeking to qualify for the third berth on the American Olympic team, Green/Parsons placed third in the rhythm dance despite a twizzle error, slightly ahead of defending national bronze medalists Hawayek/Baker, who also had a twizzle error. They were fourth in the free dance and dropped behind Hawayek/Baker overall, taking the pewter medal. They were named first alternates for the Olympic team and were sent to compete at the 2022 Four Continents Championships in Tallinn, where they won the gold medal. Parsons reflected on not making the Olympic team, saying, "even while not making the team, we set ourselves up very well for the next four years, and this is a great starting point right here. Not making the team is certainly a motivation."

2022–23 season 
Green and Parsons left their longtime coaches at Wheaton Ice Dance Academy to train at the new Michigan Ice Dance Academy founded by retired Olympic medalists Charlie White and Tanith Belbin. Of the change, Parsons said, "these next four years are about pushing ourselves as skaters, as artists, and as people."

Beginning the season at the 2022 CS Finlandia Trophy, Green/Parsons placed fifth. In their first Grand Prix at the 2022 Skate Canada International, the team placed narrowly third in the rhythm dance but were overtaken in the free dance by Canadians Lajoie/Lagha and finished in fourth place, albeit significantly improving their scores over the Finlandia Trophy. At their second Grand Prix, the 2022 NHK Trophy in Sapporo, they won the bronze medal, their first Grand Prix medal as a partnership and Green's first.

With presumptive national silver medalists Hawayek/Baker missing the 2023 U.S. Championships for health reasons, Green/Parsons entered the event as the favourites for the silver, and finished almost ten points clear of bronze medalists Carreira/Ponomarenko.

Green/Parsons entered the 2023 Four Continents Championships as contenders for the bronze medal, but after Parsons fell in the rhythm dance they placed fifth in that segment, 9.05 points back of Lajoie/Lagha in third. They placed fourth in the free dance, but remained in fifth overall, and finishing behind Carreira/Ponomarenko, who came fourth. Parsons said that they were happy with their performance on the day.

Programs

With Green

With Parsons

Competitive highlights 
GP: Grand Prix; CS: Challenger Series; JGP: Junior Grand Prix. Pewter medals (4th place) awarded only at U.S. national, sectional, and regional events.

With Green

With Parsons

References

External links

 
 
 Rachel Parsons / Michael Parsons at IceNetwork.com

American male ice dancers
1995 births
People from Wheaton, Maryland
Living people
People from Derwood, Maryland
Figure skaters at the 2012 Winter Youth Olympics
21st-century American people
Four Continents Figure Skating Championships medalists